The De Gruytters carillon book is a manuscript notebook that the Dutch Baroque musician Joannes de Gruytters used for performance on the carillon of the city of Antwerp. It contains 194 pieces of music, mostly arrangements and a few original compositions, in the form of marches, gavottes, arias, gigues, preludes, and minuets, among others.

The manuscript, dated 1746 and discovered in 1922, provides a glimpse into the music of the 18th century that was often played on carillons. It is preserved at the Royal Conservatoire Antwerp.

History
In the 18th century, the Antwerp Cathedral possessed two carillons cast by the Hemony brothers. One belonged to the city of Antwerp, and the other was owned by the cathedral. On 22 October 1740, following the death of the previous appointee, Joannes de Gruytters (1709–1772) was appointed the carillonneur of the two instruments. He had performed in a competition to win the job. To financially support himself and his family, De Gruytters also played the cathedral chapel's organ and in 1746 was engaged as a violinist for the chapel and the local theatre. In March 1746, the theatre was destroyed in a fire, which likely gave him the free time to compile a notebook of music for the carillons.

In 1922, Prosper Verheyden, clerk of the Antwerp city council and bibliophile, discovered the De Gruytters manuscript at a book auction in a pile of materials marked for their little value. At the time, Verheyden was a member of a group of Flemish Belgians who were organizing around Jef Denyn and his carillon school as a means to disseminate Flemish culture. Verheyden understood that carillon music manuscripts prior to 1900 were rare, and that he therefore discovered an item of value to carillonneurs and musicologists. He and his friend purchased the manuscript and donated it to the Royal Conservatoire Antwerp for preservation.

Verheyden studied the new manuscript and presented his findings in an address at the World Carillon Congress in 1922. It was later published as an article in The Guild of Carillonneurs in North America (GCNA)'s 1949 volume of The Bulletin. An urtext edition of the De Gruytters manuscript was published by the Royal Eijsbouts bell foundry in 1968 and again by Broekmans & Van Poppel in 1971. The GCNA published its own set of selections from the De Gruytters manuscript in 1980, edited by Albert Gerken; it published another set in 2004, edited by John Gouwens.

Significance
De Gruytters' manuscript is the earliest-known collection of carillon music that was clearly written for manual play on a carillon keyboard rather than an automatic playing drum. The latter is the case for other sources of carillon music of this time period and earlier. More importantly, it shows that the instrument was attracting better musicians, some of whom were determined to contribute to the carillon repertoire.

Contents
The manuscript is an in folio of 80 sheets,  in size. The pages, beginning on the second sheet, are numbered 1 to 152 and are followed by a table of contents at the end. The front page of the manuscript is titled "", which translates to "Andantes, marches, gavottes, arias, gigues, courantes, contra dances, allegros, preludes, minuets, trios, etc. etc. for the carillon or bell-play, gathered together and arranged by myself, Joannes de Gruytters, carillon- or bell-player of the city and cathedral of Antwerp, 1746".

The whole book contains 194 individual pieces of Baroque music, numbered 1 to 190; the last four were not numbered. De Gruytters signed his initials three times (numbers 143, 168, and 182) and provided dates eight times (numbers 88, 141, 143, 168, 175, 182, 190, 192). He attributes two additional works to himself in the table of contents (numbers 172 and 179).

The majority of the pieces are written in two-part harmony, consisting of a soprano part with an underlying basso continuo. Harmonic additions are sporadically added. One exception is number 93, which has four-part harmony. To De Gruytters, the melodic line, accentuated with ornaments, had more importance than the harmonic treatment of each work, which is standard practice for 18th century music. In his edition of the manuscript, Albert Gerken writes that many of the selections are unplayable in their original form and that De Gruytters must have played them . Gerken claims they contain many errors or simply illegible notation, showing that De Gruytters either transcribed them by listening alone or carelessly copied the sheet music.

See also
 Notebook for Anna Magdalena Bach

References

Bibliography

External links
 

1746 books
1746 compositions
18th-century manuscripts
Baroque music manuscript sources
Compositions for keyboard
Dutch manuscripts
Music anthologies